The National Senior Classical League (National SCL or NSCL) is an organization – mostly of college students – which promotes the study, appreciation and advancement of the Classics.  It is the college-level affiliate of the National Junior Classical League (NJCL), and both organizations are sponsored by the American Classical League (ACL).  Many graduates of NJCL go on to be members in NSCL; high school seniors on the cusp are known as "Slashers" – a reference to their status as "JCL/SCL" members.  The organization also awards an annual scholarship to a Classics major, in hopes of producing capable Classics teachers for the future.

Every year, members of the NSCL attend the NJCL convention to assist with and oversee some parts of convention.  The group's main contributions during the week are the administration of the Olympika sporting events; the daily publication of the Convention Ear, a humorous newsletter; and the production of "That's Entertainment", a talent show for JCL members, hosted and featuring skits by SCL members. While SCL members may attend the JCL General Assembly meetings, the SCL also holds separate meetings and elects officers during the week. These meetings are open to slashers as well.

Purpose
According to the NSCL Constitution, the objectives of the organization are as follows:
 To enhance and promote the appreciation of the classics and classical scholarship in postsecondary education
 To advise, encourage, and help the Junior Classical League.

Creed and Song
NSCL Creed
We, the members of the Senior Classical League, covenant to hand on the torch of classical civilization in the modern world. We believe an acquaintance with the civilization of Greece and Rome will help us understand and appraise this world of today, which is indebted to ancient civilization in its government and laws, literature, language and arts.

We affirm the SCL experience develops responsibility, fosters brotherhood, promotes enthusiasm, encourages competition, inspires dedication and enriches our total growth.

NSCL Song
Seeking the best, the highest our goal,
working for greatness through glories of old,
searching the realms of the golden past,
we follow the classics' truths that last.

In knowledge, truth, and fellowship,
we're growing every day;
the iron fist of SCL aids in every way.

In Rome's proud steps we're marching on
with every true colleague,
and forever we'll hold
to the Purple and Gold
of the Senior Classical League.

Officers
Listed below are the current NSCL Officers (as of September 7, 2019).

State chapters
As of 2020, current State Chapters of the NSCL:
Alabama SCL
California SCL
Florida SCL
Georgia SCL
Illinois SCL
Indiana SCL
Kentucky SCL
Louisiana SCL
Maine SCL
Maryland SCL
Massachusetts SCL
Ohio SCL
Oklahoma SCL
Ontario SCL
Pennsylvania SCL
Texas SCL
Virginia SCL
Wisconsin SCL

See also
Eta Sigma Phi - collegiate honor society/co-ed fraternity for Latin, Greek, and Classics majors

References

External links

National Junior Classical League
American Classical League
NSCL state chapters
California SCL
Georgia SCL
Kentucky SCL
Massachusetts SCL
Ohio SCL
Virginia SCL
Washington/British Columbia SCL
Wisconsin SCL

Student organizations established in 1960
American Classical League
Classical associations and societies
Organizations based in Ohio